Hector Pardoe (born 29 March 2001) is a British swimmer.

Career
Pardoe became the first British swimmer to win a medal at the World Junior Open Water Championships when he won bronze in 2017.

In 2020, he broke a British marathon swimming record in going under five hours for a 25,000-metre open water swim. Pardoe has won two consecutive top-10 finishes at the FINA Marathon Swim World Series event in Doha prior to winning an Olympic qualifying event in Portugal in 2021 which confirmed his presence in the Swimming at the 2020 Summer Olympics – Men's marathon 10 kilometre event.

Personal life
Having trained at Ellesmere College in Shropshire, England, under the tutelage of Alan Bircher from age 11 to 18, in 2020 he moved from England to train and live in Montpellier, France.

References

Living people
2001 births
British male swimmers
Olympic swimmers of Great Britain
Swimmers at the 2020 Summer Olympics
Sportspeople from Wrexham
21st-century British people